Naval Outlying Landing Field San Nicolas Island or NOLF San Nicolas Island  is a military airport located on San Nicolas Island, in Ventura County, California, United States. The airport is administered by Naval Base Ventura County and is one of several Naval Outlying Landing Fields operated by the US Navy.

The airport's ICAO identifier is KNSI. Although most U.S. airports and airbases use the same three-letter location identifier for the FAA and IATA, NOLF San Nicolas Island is assigned NSI by the FAA, and the IATA has assigned NSI to Nsimalen International Airport in Yaoundé, Cameroon. 

US Navy took over the Landing Field in January 1933 from the Civil Aeronautics Authority. Civil Aeronautics Authority built the two airstrips in the 1930s as two emergency dirt landing strips.

References

External links

GlobalSecurity.org: San Nicolas Island
History of Naval Auxiliary Air Station, San Nicolas Island

Airports in Ventura County, California
Channel Islands of California
San Nicolas Island